A household consists of two or more persons who live in the same dwelling. It may be of a single family or another type of person group. The household is the basic unit of analysis in many social, microeconomic and government models, and is important to economics and inheritance.

Household models include families, blended families, shared housing, group homes, boarding houses, houses of multiple occupancy (UK), and single room occupancy (US). In feudal societies, the royal household and medieval households of the wealthy included servants and other retainers.

Government definitions
For statistical purposes in the United Kingdom, a household is defined as "one person or a group of people who have the accommodation as their only or main residence and for a group, either share at least one meal a day or share the living accommodation, that is, a living room or sitting room". The introduction of legislation to control houses of multiple occupations in the UK Housing Act (2004) required a tighter definition of a single household. People can be considered a household if they are related: full- or half-blood, foster, step-parent/child, in-laws (and equivalent for unmarried couples), a married couple or unmarried but "living as ..." (same- or different-sex couples).

The United States Census definition also hinges on "separate living quarters": "those in which the occupants live and eat separately from any other persons in the building." According to the U.S. census, a householder is the "person (or one of the people) in whose name the housing unit is owned or rented (maintained)"; if no person qualifies, any adult resident of a housing unit is considered a householder. The U.S. government formerly used "head of the household" and "head of the family", but those terms were replaced with "householder" in 1980. In the census definition of a household, it

On July 15, 1998, Statistics Canada said: "A household is generally defined as being composed of a person or group of persons who co-reside in, or occupy, a dwelling."

Economic definition

Although a one-income-stream economic theory simplifies modeling, it does not necessarily reflect reality. Many, if not most, households have several income-earning members. Most economic models do not equate households and traditional families, and there is not always a one-to-one relationship between households and families.

Social definitions
In social work, a household is defined similarly: a residential group in which housework is divided and performed by householders. Care may be delivered by one householder to another, depending upon their respective needs, abilities, and (perhaps) disabilities. Household composition may affect life and health expectations and outcomes for its members. Eligibility for community services and welfare benefits may depend upon household composition.

In sociology, household work strategy (a term coined by Ray Pahl in his 1984 book, Divisions of Labour) is the division of labour among members of a household. Household work strategies vary over the life cycle as household members age, or with the economic environment; they may be imposed by one person, or be decided collectively.

Feminism examines how gender roles affect the division of labour in households. In The Second Shift and The Time Bind, sociologist Arlie Russell Hochschild presents evidence that in two-career couples men and women spend about equal amounts of time working; however, women spend more time on housework. Cathy Young (another feminist writer) says that in some cases, women may prevent the equal participation of men in housework and parenting.

Models

Household models in the English-speaking world include traditional and blended families, shared housing, and group homes for people with support needs. Other models which may meet definitions of a household include boarding houses, houses in multiple occupation (UK), and single room occupancy (US).

History

In feudal or aristocratic societies, a household may include servants or retainers who derive their income from the household's principal income.

Housing statistics

Housing conditions

Belgium 
A 1961–62 National Housing Institute survey estimated that 13.8 percent of Belgian dwellings were unfit and incapable of improvement. A further 19.5 percent were unfit but had the potential to be improved, and 54 percent were considered suitable (without alteration or improvement) for modern living standards. Seventy-four percent of dwellings lacked a shower or bath, 19 percent had inadequate sewage disposal, and 3.6 percent lacked a drinking-water supply; 36.8 percent had an indoor water closet. According to a 1964 study, 13 percent of Belgium's housing consisted of slums. In 1974 an estimated 17% of the Belgian population lived in a detached house, while 23% lived in an attached house, 56% in an apartment or flat, and 4% in other types of homes (trailers, mobile homes, etc.). In terms of amenities, in 1975 an estimated 1% of all houses were without a flush toilet, 1% without electric lighting, 37% without a fixed bath or shower and 7% without piped water.

Austria 
In 1974 an estimated 28% of the Austrian population lived in a detached house, while 5% lived in an attached house, 64% in an apartment or flat, and 4% in other types of homes (trailers, mobile homes, etc.). In terms of amenities, in 1975 an estimated 10% of all houses were without a flush toilet, 1% without electric lighting, 34% without a fixed bath or shower and 8% without piped water.

Ireland 
In 1974 an estimated 27% of the Irish population lived in a detached house, while 55% lived in an attached house, 11% in an apartment or flat, and 8% in other types of homes (trailers, mobile homes, etc.). In terms of amenities, in 1975 an estimated 21% of all houses were without a flush toilet, 2% without electric lighting, 20% without a fixed bath or shower and 14% without piped water.

Japan 
In 1973 an estimated 65% of the Japanese population lived in a detached house, while 12% lived in an attached house, and 23% in an apartment or flat. In terms of amenities, in 1975 an estimated 65% of all houses were without a flush toilet, 1% without electric lighting, 3% without a fixed bath or shower and 1% without piped water.

Netherlands 
In 1974 an estimated 18% of the Dutch population lived in a detached house, while 40% lived in an attached house, 36% in an apartment or flat, and 6% in other types of homes (trailers, mobile homes, etc.). In terms of amenities, in 1975 an estimated 1% of all houses were without a flush toilet, 1% without electric lighting, 2% without a fixed bath or shower and 1% without piped water.

Italy 
In 1974 an estimated 18% of the Italian population lived in a detached house, while 9% lived in an attached house, 65% in an apartment or flat, and 8% in other types of homes (trailers, mobile homes, etc.). In terms of amenities, in 1975 an estimated 4% of all houses were without a flush toilet, 2% without electric lighting, 27% without a fixed bath or shower and 1% without piped water.

Norway 
In 1974 an estimated 45% of the Norwegian population lived in a detached house, while 7% lived in an attached house, 46% in an apartment or flat, and 2% in other types of homes (trailers, mobile homes, etc.). In terms of amenities, in 1975 an estimated 13% of all houses were without a flush toilet, 1% without electric lighting, 25% without a fixed bath or shower and 1% without piped water.

Sweden 
In 1974 an estimated 36% of the Swedish population lived in a detached house, while 8% lived in an attached house, and 56% in an apartment or flat. In terms of amenities, in 1975 an estimated 2% of all houses were without a flush toilet, 1% without electric lighting, 2% without a fixed bath or shower and 1% without piped water.

Denmark 
In 1974 an estimated 50% of the Danish population lived in a detached house, while 11% lived in an attached house, 31% in an apartment or flat, and 8% in other types of homes (trailers, mobile homes, etc.). In terms of amenities, in 1975 an estimated 1% of all houses were without a flush toilet, 1% without electric lighting, 10% without a fixed bath or shower and 1% without piped water.

Switzerland 
In 1974 an estimated 33% of the Swiss population lived in a detached house, while 5% lived in an attached house, and 62% in an apartment or flat. In terms of amenities, in 1975 an estimated 3% of all houses were without a flush toilet, 1% without electric lighting, 15% without a fixed bath or shower and 1% without piped water.

Spain 
In 1974 an estimated 12% of the Spanish population lived in a detached house, while 23% lived in an attached house, 61% in an apartment or flat, and 4% in other types of homes (trailers, mobile homes, etc.). In terms of amenities, in 1970/75 an estimated 29% of all houses were without a flush toilet, 4% without electric lighting, 54% without a fixed bath or shower and 32% without piped water.

West Germany 
In 1974 an estimated 22% of the West German population lived in a detached house, while 5% lived in an attached house, 69% in an apartment or flat, and 4% in other types of homes (trailers, mobile homes, etc.). In terms of amenities, in 1975 an estimated 4% of all houses were without a flush toilet, 1% without electric lighting, 6% without a fixed bath or shower and 1% without piped water.

France 
Between 1954 and 1973, the percentage of French homes with a shower or bath increased from 10 to 65 percent. During that period, the percentage of homes without flush toilets fell from 73 to 30 percent; homes without running water fell from 42 to 3.4 percent. A 1948 law permitted gradual, long-term rent increases for existing flats on the condition that part of the money was spent on repairs. According to John Ardagh, the law, "vigorously applied, was partly successful in its twofold aim: to encourage both repairs and new building." In 1974 an estimated 17% of the French population lived in a detached house, while 2% lived in an attached house, 78% in an apartment or flat, and 3% in other types of homes (trailers, mobile homes, etc.). In terms of amenities, in 1975 an estimated 20% of all houses were without a flush toilet, 1% without electric lighting, 34% without a fixed bath or shower and 3% without piped water.

United Kingdom 
After World War II, a large percentage of British housing was single-family housing. Seventy-eight percent of housing in 1961 consisted of single-family homes, compared to 56 percent in the Netherlands, 49 percent in West Germany and 32 percent in France. In England and Wales in 1964, 6.6 percent of housing units had two or fewer rooms; 5.8 percent had seven or more rooms, 15.2 percent had six rooms, 35.1 percent had five rooms, 26.3 percent had four rooms, and 11.1 percent had three rooms. These figures included kitchens when they were used for eating meals. Fifty percent of 1964 housing had three bedrooms; 1.9 percent had five or more bedrooms, 6.2 percent had four bedrooms, 10.5 percent had one bedroom or none, and 31.3 percent had two bedrooms. A 1960 social survey estimated that 0.6 percent of households in England and Wales exceeded the statutory overcrowding standard; the 1964 percentage was 0.5 percent. In 1964, 6.9 of all households exceeded one person per room. The 1960 figure was 11 percent, with 1.75 percent having two or more bedrooms below the standard and 9.25 percent having one bedroom below the standard. This declined slightly by 1964 to 9.4 percent of households below the standard, with 8.1 percent having one bedroom below the standard and 1.3 percent having two bedrooms or more below the standard. According to local authorities in 1965, five percent of the housing stock in England and Wales was unfit for habitation. In 1974 an estimated 23% of the population of the UK lived in a detached house, while 50% lived in an attached house, 23% in an apartment or flat, and 4% in other types of homes (trailers, mobile homes, etc.). In terms of amenities, in 1975 an estimated 1% of all houses were without a flush toilet, 1% without electric lighting, 3% without a fixed bath or shower and 1% without piped water.

U.S. and Canada 
Housing conditions improved in Canada and the U.S. after World War II. In the U.S., 35.4 percent of all 1950 dwellings did not have complete plumbing facilities; the figure fell to 16.8 percent in 1960 and 8.4 percent in 1968. In Canada from 1951 to 1971, the percentage of dwellings with a bath or shower increased from 60.8 to 93.4 percent; the percentage of dwellings with hot and cold running water increased from 56.9 to 93.5 percent. In the United States from 1950 to 1974, the percentage of housing without full plumbing fell from 34 to three percent; during that period, the percentage of housing stock considered dilapidated fell from nine percent to less than four. In 1976, an estimated 64% of the population of the U.S.A. lived in a detached house, while 4% lived in an attached house, 28% in an apartment or flat, and 4% in other types of homes (trailers, mobile homes, etc.). In terms of amenities, in 1975 an estimated 2% of all houses in the U.S.A. were without a flush toilet, 1% without electric lighting, 3% without a fixed bath or shower and 1% without piped water. In 1977 an estimated 59% of the population of Canada lived in a detached house, while 8% lived in an attached house, and 33% in an apartment or flat. In terms of amenities, in 1975/77 an estimated 3% of all houses in Canada were without a flush toilet, 1% without electric lighting, 2% without a fixed bath or shower and 1% without piped water.

See also 

 Dwelling
 Oikos
 List of countries by number of households
 Household economics
 Household final consumption expenditure
 Household income in the United States
 Household production
 Family
 Intra-household bargaining
 Roommate
 Group home
 Hoju – South Korea
 Home
 Homemaker
 Medieval household
 Royal Household

References

Sources 
 The Economist Book Of Vital World Statistics: A Complete Guide To The World In Figures (introduction by Claus Moser). The Economist Books, fourth reprint, paperback edition, October 1992. Contains a section, "Consumer Durables", with estimates of household ownership of a wide range of consumer durables in OECD and East European countries.

External links 

 Contains information on housing conditions and types in various countries in the 1960s and 1970s
 
 
 
 
 
 
 
 
 
 
 
 
 
 
 
 

Family economics
National accounts
Family concepts